The Gertrudes are a Canadian indie folk band from Kingston, Ontario, founded in 2008. From 2009-2012 they found significant placement on campus music charts, toured Canada coast to coast, and reached number 1 on the CBC R3-30 charts. From 2013 to 2020, they released and performed very occasionally, in connection with community issues. In 2020 during the COVID-19 pandemic, a new phase of writing and recording began which has resulted in a new album, Emergency To Emergency, for release in November 2021.

History
The Gertrudes were formed in Kingston, Ontario in 2008. The band's name was a reference to a founding member's grandmother, who the family believes to be reincarnated in his sister of the same name. Musicians performing with the band varied from one show to the next, but core members included Greg Tilson (guitar, vocals), Annie Clifford (banjo, vocals), Lucas Huang (ukulele, percussion),  Jason Erb (piano), Matt Rogalsky (guitar, mandolin), Josh Lyon (trumpet, piano, accordion), Pete Bowers (percussion), Chris Trimmer (theremin), and Pim van Geffen (trombone), with Amanda Balsys (violin, vocals) joining in time for their first full-length release, Dawn Time Riot in 2010. PS I Love You were guest musicians on one track of Dawn Time Riot. Exclaim! called the album "a meticulously crafted spectrum of modern folk sound".

Their single All the Dollar Bills Sing Hallelujah debuted at the top of the CBC Radio 3 R3-30 chart in the summer of 2013. They also placed multiple albums on the !earshot campus and community music charts. In 2012 they played during the finale of the Vancouver Folk Music Festival alongside the Tao Rodriguez-Seeger Band.

After their early years of regularly performing and recording, the band occasionally reassembled between 2013 and 2020 to contribute to community and activist projects, including providing the score for a 2014 documentary about the closure of prison farms across Canada, releasing a song critical of first Prime Minister John A. Macdonald's racist and expansionist policies in counterpoint to celebrations on his 200th birthday in 2015, and in 2016 releasing a song and music video to protest a plan to extend a road through Douglas Fluhrer Park in Kingston.

During the global pandemic beginning in 2020, The Gertrudes began a new intensive phase of songwriting and recording, towards an album to be released in Fall 2021. Keeping with COVID restrictions, recording sessions were held in band members' gardens and homes, and continued as possible given changing restrictions on gatherings. Sessions were engineered by Dylan Lodge, Jason Mercer, and Matt Rogalsky, with Rogalsky and Mercer each mixing half the album's songs and co-producing the album with The Gertrudes. Several of the band members and many of the backing vocalists also recorded their own parts at home and sent them in for mixing. 

As of September 2021, several singles have been released, including "The Other Side", "Parham" and "New Carolina". The full album will be released on November 26 on Wolfe Island Records. To coincide with the new album, The Gertrudes have digitally re-released their Hard Water EP and three earlier albums on all streaming services.

Discography

Singles and EPs
 This Be Our EP (self-released, 2008) EP
 Hard Water (Apple Crisp Records, 2009) EP
 Emergency to Emergency (2020) Single
 The Other Side (2020) Single
Parham (2021) Single
New Carolina (2021) Single

Albums
 Dawn Time Riot (Apple Crisp Records, 2010)
 Till the Morning Shows Her Face to Me (Apple Crisp Records, 2011)
 Neighbourhood  (Apple Crisp Records, 2013)
Emergency To Emergency (Wolfe Island Records, 2021) (Release date November 26 2021)

See also

Music of Canada
List of Canadian musicians
List of bands from Canada
:Category:Canadian musical groups

References

External links
 Official website

Musical groups established in 2008
Musical groups disestablished in 2021
Canadian indie rock groups
Musical groups from Kingston, Ontario
Canadian folk rock groups
Canadian indie folk groups
2008 establishments in Ontario
2021 disestablishments in Ontario